Okpho (also spelt Okpo) is a small town and seat of Okpho Township, Tharrawaddy District, in the Bago Region of southern-central Myanmar. It lies south of Gyobingauk and north of Minhla. It contains a hospital, a pagoda, and an open ground in the town centre. The Okpho Railway Station is operated by Myanmar Railways and the town also contains a police station.

The population of Okpho's urban area is 11,525 as of 2014, while Okpho Township's population is 126,662.

Notable people
Chit Maung (1913–1945) - journalist, patriotic writer who worked for Bogyoke Aung San, the father of Aung San Suu Kyi. He was Chief Editor of New Light of Burma. Later his own Journalgyaw Newspaper was well known in Burma.
U Saw - Politician and assassin of Aung San and several Burmese Martyrs

References

External links
Maplandia World Gazetteer

Populated places in Tharrawaddy District
Township capitals of Myanmar
Okpho Township